The 2021 season was the 14th season for the Indian Premier League franchise Kolkata Knight Riders (KKR). They were one of the eight teams that compete in the 2021 Indian Premier League. The franchise won the tournament in 2012 and 2014.The team was captained by Eoin Morgan with Brendon McCullum as the team coach.

Background

Player retention and transfers 

The franchise retained 17 players and released six players.

Retained Eoin Morgan, Andre Russell, Dinesh Karthik, Kamlesh Nagarkoti, Kuldeep Yadav, Lockie Ferguson, Nitish Rana, Prasidh Krishna, Rinku Singh, Sandeep Warrier, Shivam Mavi, Shubman Gill, Sunil Narine, Pat Cummins, Rahul Tripathi, Varun Chakravarthy, Tim Seifert

Released Chris Green, Harry Gurney, M Siddharth, Nikhil Naik, Siddhesh Lad, Tom Banton

Added Harbhajan Singh, Shakib Al Hasan, Sheldon Jackson, Vaibhav Arora, Venkatesh Iyer, Karun Nair, Ben Cutting

Squad 
 Players with international caps are listed in bold.

Administration and support staff

Kit manufacturers and sponsors

|

Teams and standings

Results by match

League table

League stage

The full schedule was published on the IPL website on 7 March 2021.

Matches

Playoffs

Eliminator

Qualifier 2

Final

Statistics

Most runs

 Source: ESPN Cricinfo

Most wickets

 Source: ESPN Cricinfo

Player of the match awards

References

Kolkata Knight Riders seasons
2021 Indian Premier League